Qilin District is a district of the city of Qujing, Yunnan province, China.

Administrative divisions
Qilin District has 13 subdistricts and 3 towns. 
13 subdistricts

3 towns
 Yuezhou
 Dongshan
 Ciying

References

External links
Qilin District Official Website

County-level divisions of Qujing